These are the official results of the Men's Decathlon competition at the 1992 Summer Olympics in Barcelona, Spain. There were a total number of 36 participating athletes, with eight competitors who didn't finish the competition.

Medalists

Schedule

August 5, 1992

August 6, 1992

Records

Results

See also
1991 Men's World Championship Decathlon
1992 Hypo-Meeting
1992 Decathlon Year Ranking
1993 Men's World Championship Decathlon

References

External links
 Official Report
 Results

Decathlon
1992
Men's events at the 1992 Summer Olympics